A Fig for Fortune is a 1596 long allegorical poem by the English Catholic writer Anthony Copley written as a parodying response to Edmund Spenser's The Faerie Queene. It intended to reject both Protestant portrayals of English Catholics as inherently disloyal to Queen Elizabeth, as well as hard-line Jesuit calls for Catholics to become martyrs by resisting the Protestant Queen.

Text
Unlike The Faerie Queene, which is written in Spenserian stanzas, A Fig for Fortune is written in the Venus and Adonis stanza: iambic pentameter rhyming ABABCC.

References

Bibliography

1596 poems
English poems
English-language poems
The Faerie Queene